Jetsadakorn Hemdaeng, born March 2, 1986) simply known as Buaw is a Thai professional footballer who plays as a right back.

Club career

Jetsadakorn began his career with Chonburi. He played for Chonburi in the 2008 AFC Champions League group stages. In 2012, he was loaned to Wuachon United, after the second leg of the 2012 Thai Premier League he moved back to Chonburi. At the end of the 2013 Thai Premier League he moved to Bangkok Glass, this is his first permanent move from Chonburi. On 30 November 2021, he was appointed as a manager of Ubon Kruanapat after joining the club in July 2021.

International career

In 2012 Jetsadakorn debuted for Thailand against Bhutan in a friendly match.

International

Honours

Clubs
Chonburi
 Thai Premier League (1): 2007
 Thai FA Cup (1): 2010
 Kor Royal Cup (3): 2008, 2009, 2011

Bangkok Glass
 Thai FA Cup (1): 2014

References

External links
 Profile at Goal

1986 births
Living people
Jetsadakorn Hemdaeng
Jetsadakorn Hemdaeng
Association football central defenders
Jetsadakorn Hemdaeng
Jetsadakorn Hemdaeng
Jetsadakorn Hemdaeng
Jetsadakorn Hemdaeng
Jetsadakorn Hemdaeng
Jetsadakorn Hemdaeng